The Africa Cricket Association (ACA) is an international body which coordinates the development of cricket in Africa. The ACA was founded in 1997, and has 23 member countries.

The role of the ACA includes promoting the development of cricket in Africa and organising some regional tournaments. These have included the ACA Africa T20 Cup and the Africa Women's Twenty20 Championship, as well as intercontinental tournaments like the Afro-Asia Cup. The role of the ACA is complementary to the International Cricket Council (ICC), which organises the regional qualifying tournaments for global events.

History
 
The ACA has its origins in the Zone VI Cricket Confederation, which was established in 1991 to coordinate international cricket in Southern Africa along the lines of the African Zone VI Athletics Championships. The inaugural Zone VI tournament was held in Windhoek in September 1991 with Namibia, Botswana, Lesotho, Malawi, and Zambia participating along with the Oxford University Cricket Club as guests. The confederation soon secured the support of the United Cricket Board of South Africa and expanded outside of Southern Africa, with Uganda joining in 1994 and Kenya joining in 1995. In March 1996, a meeting was held in Johannesburg to discuss the formation of an Africa-wide body.

The inaugural annual general meeting of the Africa Cricket Association (ACA) was held in Harare in August 1997. The last Zone VI tournament was also held in 1997 and replaced by an Africa Cup open to countries from all around the continent. Hoosain Ayob was appointed as full-time development director. Peter Chingoka of Zimbabwe was elected chairman of the ACA in 1998, replacing South Africa's Krish Mackerdhuj.

ACA member nations

Full Test Status Nations

Associate Members with ODI status

Associate Members

Map

Tournaments
 2022 ACA Africa T20 Cup
 Afro-Asian Cup.
 WCL Africa
 Kwibuka T20 Tournament

References

External links
 ACA Website
 ICC region page

Cricket administration
Cric
Cricket in Africa
Sports organizations established in 1997